"Moskau" (German for Moscow) is the second single by German Eurodisco group Dschinghis Khan (known as Genghis Khan in Australia and other countries) released in 1979.

The band also recorded an English version, which they released in 1980 as "Moscow".

History
"Moskau" achieved enormous popularity in the Soviet Union. A 15-second clip of the song's performance was shown as a part of the New Year holiday lineup on the state-run TV, leading to the immediate dismissal of the network's director.

In 2006, the song made its video game debut as a playable song in Taiko no Tatsujin Portable 2. On September 15, the song was uploaded to YouTube, and it quickly became an internet meme related to Slavs. Most prominently, the meme was circulated on the image macro site YTMND, accompanied by the song's chorus or variations of it.

The song was also played at the opening at the Eurovision Song Contest 2009 in Moscow, Russia for Semi-Final 2.

"Moskau" is also a featured track in Just Dance 2014. 

In 2018, Dschinghis Khan re-recorded "Moskau" with new lyrics for the 2018 FIFA World Cup, which was hosted in Russia. For the German and English versions, the lead vocals were performed by former US5 member Jay Khan. Alexander Malinin and his daughter Ustinya performed the Russian version, titled "Moskva". The Spanish version, titled "Moscú", was performed by Jorge Jiménez and Marifer Medrano.

Versions

Moskau – the German-language version
"Moskau", the German-language version of the song, appears on their 1979 self-titled album Dschinghis Khan and their 1980 album Rom. The album version is nearly six minutes long, while the single version is four and a half minutes long.

Moscow – the English-language version
The band, under their English-language band name Genghis Khan, released a version of the song with English lyrics entitled "Moscow" in Australia in 1980, the year of the 1980 Moscow Olympics. Australia's Channel 7 used the song as the theme to their television coverage of the Moscow Olympics, and the single was issued locally in a die-cut Channel 7 paper sleeve. The song became a massive hit in Australia, staying at #1 for six weeks.

Rocking Son of Dschinghis Khan
"Rocking Son of Dschinghis Khan" is the B-side of "Moskau", featuring Leslie Mándoki performing the chorus and Louis Hendrik Potgieter singing the final chorus. The song was also recorded in English and released as a single in 1979, with "Moscow" as the B-side.

Track listings

Charts

Weekly charts

Year-end charts

Certifications

Covers and Remixes
Another Japanese version by Baobab Singers was released that year, but with different lyrics.
 The song has been covered by a German rock band named Attila der Partykönig.
 The song has been covered by the German ska-punk band "Wisecräcker".
 Sofia Rotaru had recorded a Russian cover version in preparation for the 1980 Summer Olympics, but due to West Germany joining the 1980 Summer Olympics boycott, it was never broadcast and had been ordered destroyed. A single copy was made by the studio workers, and has been made available since.
 In Finland "Moskau" was covered by Juhamatti with the title "Volga" in 1980. "Volga" has since been performed by artists such as Kari Tapio and Frederik.
 Also in 1980, Cassiano Costa made the Brazilian Portuguese version, named "Moscou".
 This song was also covered by Hong Kong pop singer George Lam as "Olympics in Moscow" (Chinese: 世運在莫斯科).
 Georgie Dann made a Spanish version in 1980, with more success in Spanish-speaking countries than the original version.
 Swedish group Vikingarna recorded a cover in Swedish, "Moskva", in 1980.
 In live performances of their song "Sacrament of Wilderness", the symphonic metal band Nightwish plays a riff from "Moskau" at about the three-minute mark of the song.
 German black metal band Black Messiah covered the song on their 2006 album Of Myths and Legends.
 Estonian band Meie Mees covered the song as "Moskva" in 2000.
 In China, a version with altered lyrics called "Fen Dou" (奋斗) was made by Da Zhangwei (大张伟).
 South Korean group Koyote played a portion in their single "Aza! Aza!" (아자! 아자!).
 Since 2008 or earlier, Russian Armed Forces military bands have occasionally played the song at public events in Russia. Channel One Russia's New Years 2013 program included a version of the song sung in both German and Russian by the Alexandrov Ensemble.
 A version sung by the cast of the 2010 Musical Film Morozko (Морозко), aired on Russia 1 on December 31, 2010. Nikolai Baskov stars in this one.
 In the Czech Republic, the parody band Los Rotopedos produced a cover of the song in 2012. Los Rotopedos subsequently qualified to the top ten in the Český slavík song competition.
 In 2013 song was covered by a French band Dancing Bros. and used in the video game Just Dance 2014.
 In 2018, Japanese DJ-producer Camellia remixed Moskau as a free-download bootleg in hands-up trance genre.
 American power metal band Last Alliance covered "Moskau" in 2011. The song was made available as a free download in 2018 to celebrate the 2018 FIFA World Cup hosted in Russia.
 In early 2020, Dutch DJ & Producer Thommy van Straalen started rising to fame after releasing a Big Room House Festival Mix as a collab with his neighbor Likkerstan 'LSTN' Ten Nogmeer. It was deleted midway through May after a copyright problem with Dschinghis Khan.
Klezmer-punk act Daniel Kahn, alongside Psoy Korolenko, released a trilingual Yiddish-, Russian-, and English-language cover, “Moskve,” in 2020.
German YouTuber Jarow made a cover of the song about Norwegian footballer Erling Haaland. It went viral on TikTok in 2021.

References

External links
 
  

1979 singles
German-language songs
Songs written by Ralph Siegel
Disco songs
Songs about Moscow
Number-one singles in Australia
Vikingarna (band) songs
Bertelsmann Music Group singles
Internet memes introduced in 2004